Jo Hyun-jae (born May 9, 1980) is a South Korean actor. Jo made his entertainment debut as a singer in the four-member boy band Guardian, which disbanded after releasing their self-titled album in 1998. In 2000, after he drew popularity when he appeared in a commercial for sports drink Pocari Sweat, Jo began acting. He is best known for his leading roles in Love Letter (2003), Only You (2005), Ballad of Seodong (2005), and 49 Days (2011).

Personal life 
On March 18, 2018 Jo announced his plans of marriage to his non-celebrity girlfriend a retired professional golfer. The couple dated for three years and married on March 24, 2018. Their first child was born on November 20, 2018. On October 27, 2021, his wife gave birth to a second daughter.

Filmography

Television series

Variety Show

Film

Music video

Discography

Awards and nominations

References

External links
 

1980 births
South Korean male television actors
South Korean male film actors
South Korean pop singers
Male actors from Seoul
Living people
Dankook University alumni
21st-century South Korean male singers